Tartu Vocational Education Centre (abbreviation TKHK) is a vocational school in Tartu, Estonia. It is the biggest vocational school in Estonia.

As of 2021, over 2700 students are studying at degree study and over 3000 students at adults schooling.

TKHK is founded in 2002 as a merger of four schools: Tartu Ehitus‐ ja Kergetööstuskool (established in 1944), Tartu Industrial School (established in 1922), Tartu Teeninduskool (established in 1984) and Tartu Õppekeskus (established in 1970).

References

External links
 

Vocational schools
Schools in Tartu